Philippe Schuth (15 December 1966 – 17 February 2002) was a French professional footballer who played as a goalkeeper.

Career
Born in Forbach, Schuth began playing football with Merlebach, before turning professional with RC Strasbourg in 1983. He later played for Angers SCO, US Dunkerque, FC Metz, FC Lorient, Toulouse FC, FC Gueugnon and AS Nancy.

Personal
Schuth died in an automobile accident in Custines in February 2002.

Honours
Gueugnon
 Coupe de la Ligue: 1999–2000

References

External links
Profile at Racingstub.com

1966 births
2002 deaths
French people of German descent
Association football goalkeepers
French footballers
RC Strasbourg Alsace players
Angers SCO players
USL Dunkerque players
FC Metz players
FC Lorient players
Toulouse FC players
FC Gueugnon players
AS Nancy Lorraine players
Road incident deaths in France
People from Forbach
Sportspeople from Moselle (department)
Footballers from Grand Est